Gomersall is a surname. Notable people with the surname include:

 Barry Gomersall (1945–2007), Australian rugby league referee
 Stephen Gomersall, British diplomat and businessman
 Vic Gomersall (born 1942), English footballer